The 1908 Washington & Jefferson Red and Black football team represented Washington & Jefferson College as an independent during the 1908 college football season. Led by first-year head David C. Morrow, Washington & Jefferson compiled a record of 10–2–1.

Schedule

References

Washington and Jefferson
Washington & Jefferson Presidents football seasons
Washington and Jefferson Red and Black football